Vassiliy Valeryevich Jirov (born 4 April 1974), sometimes known as Vasily Zhirov, is a Kazakhstani former professional boxer who competed from 1997 to 2009, and held the IBF cruiserweight title from 1999 to 2003. As an amateur he won a gold medal at the 1996 Olympics, as well as consecutive bronzes at the 1993 and 1995 World Championships, all in the light heavyweight division.

Amateur career
Jirov took up boxing in 1986 when he was 12, studying at the Balkhash Technical School. His first coach was Alexander Apachinsky (Merited Trainer of the Republic of Kazakhstan, Master of Sports of the USSR). Jirov later recalled that:

From 1989 to 1991, he became the champion of the Kazakh SSR three times in a row. In 1990 he became the champion of the All-Union Spartakiad of Young Students (4 fights, 4 victories, Moscow,) and also won the USSR Youth Championship (4 fights, 4 victories, Donetsk,) received a degree of Master of Sports of the USSR in boxing.

In 1991, Jirov, who was yet at the junior age class, didn't win the USSR Championship in Saratov (4 fights, 3 wins, 2nd place,) however he received an invitation to the USSR youth team.

In 1994, Vassiliy moved to the light heavyweight division (up to 81 kg.)

In December 1996, Jirov travelled to the United States, where he signed a contract with boxing promoter Bob Arum and began his career as a professional boxer.

Highlights

 International Junior Tournament (Middleweight), Tashkent, Uzbek SSR, December 1991:
 (no data available)
 European Junior Championships (Middleweight), Edinburgh, Scotland, April 1992:
1/4: Defeated Thomas Hansvold (Norway) RSC 2
1/2: Defeated Rickard Eckvall (Sweden) 12–6
Finals: Defeated Sinan Şamil Sam (Turkey) 11–7
 World Championships (Middleweight), Tampere, Finland, May 1993:
1/8: Defeated Francesco Passanante (Switzerland) RSC 3
1/4: Defeated Andrey Khamula (Ukraine) 15–9
1/2: Lost to Akin Kuloglu (Turkey) 2–9
World Cup (Light heavyweight), Bangkok, Thailand, June 1994:
1/8: Defeated Haik Postolokyan (Armenia) 11–3
1/4: Lost to Islam Arsangaliev (Russia) 4–12
 Asian Games (Light heavyweight), Hiroshima, Japan, October 1994:
1/4: Defeated Asghar Ali (Pakistan) RSC
1/2: Lost to Young-Sam Ko (South Korea) 10–17
 Chemistry Cup (Light heavyweight), Halle, Germany, March 1995:
1/4: Defeated Sven Ottke (Germany) PTS
1/2: Defeated Thomas Ulrich (Germany) by walkover
Finals: Defeated Ulf Brezina (Germany) RET 1
 Sweden Open (Light heavyweight), Stockholm, Sweden, 1996:
Finals: Defeated Stephen Kirk (Ireland) RSC 2

 Korean Open (Light heavyweight), Seoul, South Korea, 1995:
 (no data available)
 World Championships (Light heavyweight), Berlin, Germany, May 1995:
1/8: Defeated Ervins Helmanis (Latvia) KO 2
1/4: Defeated Ismael Kone (Sweden) RSC 1
1/2: Lost to Antonio Tarver (United States) 6–9
 Asian Championships (Light heavyweight), Tashkent, Uzbekistan, October 1995:
1/4: Defeated Vitaliy Ilyushin (Turkmenistan) RET 2
1/2: Defeated Ayoub Pourtaghi Ghoushchi (Iran) 10–1
Finals: Defeated Lee Seung-bae (South Korea) 15–2
 Moscow Open (Light heavyweight), Moscow, Russia, October 1995:
Finals: Defeated Timur Ibragimov (Uzbekistan) by unanimous decision, 5–0
 Chemistry Cup (Light heavyweight), Halle, Germany, February–March 1996:
1/4: Defeated Rostyslav Zaulychnyi (Ukraine) 12–1
1/2: Defeated Ramón Garbey (Cuba) 18–10
Finals: Defeated Thomas Ulrich (Germany) by walkover
 Summer Olympics (Light heavyweight), Atlanta, Georgia, July–August 1996:
1/16: Defeated Julio César González (Mexico) RSC 2
1/8: Defeated Pietro Aurino (Italy) 18–3
1/4: Defeated Troy Amos-Ross (Canada) 14–8
1/2: Defeated Antonio Tarver (United States) 15–9
Finals: Defeated Lee Seung-Bae (South Korea) 17–4

Jirov was awarded the Val Barker Trophy for outstanding performance at the 1996 Summer Olympics.

He finished his amateur career having 217 fights under his belt, with a record of 207 wins, 10 losses (no stoppages.)

Professional career
Jirov made his debut as a professional on 18 January 1997, with a two-round knockout of Vince Brown in Las Vegas. He won eleven fights that first year, all by knockout, including wins over Exum Speight and Art Jimmerson. In 1998, he won eight fights, six before the final bell. On 5 May he won the WBC's regional cruiserweight title with a 12-round decision over Rich La Montaigne, who became the first boxer to last the full distance against Jirov. On 5 December he once again fought in Ukrainian territory. In his first fight as a professional in Ukraine, he beat Alexander Vasiliev in Kyiv by decision in eight rounds.

IBF cruiserweight champion
In 1999, Jirov was given his first world title try: In front of an HBO Boxing audience, he beat IBF world Cruiserweight champion Arthur Williams by a knockout in seven rounds at Biloxi, Mississippi, to become that organization's world cruiserweight champion.

For his first defense, he fought at the main supportive event at the Felix Trinidad-Oscar De La Hoya undercard on 18 September, retaining the crown with a ten-round knockout of Canadian Dale Brown.

In 2000, he beat Saul Montana by knockout in round nine to retain the world title on an Univision televised fight, and won two non-title bouts, including one over Esteban Pizarro at the Playboy mansion.

On 6 February 2001, Jirov went to Kazakhstan to defend his crown in his home-country for the first time. There, he retained the title with a first-round knockout of Álex González. He won three more fights that year, one a world title affair against Julian Letterlough (knockout win in 8).

In 2002 Jirov, then managed by the Sugar Ray Leonard promotion company, defended his crown once that year, beating former world Middleweight champion Jorge Castro of Argentina by a 12-round decision on 1 February at the Celebrity Theater in Phoenix. Talks had begun about a fight of his against former multiple division world champion James Toney. However, negotiations took long and Jirov spent more than one year outside the ring, time in which the IBF threatened to take away recognition of Jirov as world champion if he did not defend his crown soon. As a result of these managerial problems, Jirov also moved from the SAR club gym, favored by his management, to Joe Diaz's Gym, near Downtown Phoenix.

Losing the title to Toney
Jirov and Toney finally met on 26 April 2003, and Jirov suffered his first career defeat, when he lost the IBF cruiserweight title to Toney by a 12-round unanimous decision. On 9 August Jirov came back, beating fringe contender Ernest Mateen by knockout in seven rounds.

On 6 November 2003 he won the NABO regional cruiserweight title with a six-round knockout of Joseph Kiwanuka in Phoenix. Jirov's next fight was against ex-heavyweight champion, Michael Moorer.  Jirov was beaten by Moorer via TKO in the ninth round. Over the next six months, Jirov defeated Forrest Neal by knockout in round 3 and defeated Troy Beats by unanimous decision.  His next fight was against former heavyweight and cruiserweight contender Orlin Norris.  Jirov and Norris fought to a draw.

In his first return bout to the cruiserweight division (April 20, 2006) he defeated Luke Munsen in a unanimous decision.
 
On 14 July 2007 Jirov defeated Kenny 'The Raven' Craven by TKO in second round of 10 round scheduled bout.

As a heavyweight, Jirov also lost to Joe Mesi by unanimous decision, after throwing a blow to Mesi that resulted in subdural bleeding near the fight's end. It also marked the downturn in Jirov's fighting career, and after a few more fights, he retired in 2009.

Post-fight career in boxing
Jirov lives in Arizona and works at the Scottsdale Boxing Club as a coach. Reflecting on his time as a fighter, Jirov said: “I travelled the world, got paid and kicked some ass.”

Professional boxing record

References

External links
 

1974 births
Living people
People from Karaganda Region
Olympic boxers of Kazakhstan
Boxers at the 1996 Summer Olympics
Olympic gold medalists for Kazakhstan
Southpaw boxers
International Boxing Federation champions
Olympic medalists in boxing
Asian Games medalists in boxing
Boxers at the 1994 Asian Games
Kazakhstani male boxers
AIBA World Boxing Championships medalists
Medalists at the 1996 Summer Olympics
Asian Games bronze medalists for Kazakhstan
Medalists at the 1994 Asian Games
Light-heavyweight boxers
Heavyweight boxers
World cruiserweight boxing champions
Kazakhstani people of Russian descent
Converts to Islam